Kilyatl is a rural locality (a selo) in Gumbetovsky District, Republic of Dagestan, Russia. The population was 1,032 as of 2010. There are 19 streets.

Geography 
Kilyatl is located 38 km southwest of Mekhelta (the district's administrative centre) by road. Nizhneye Inkho and Verkhneye Inkho are the nearest rural localities.

References 

Rural localities in Gumbetovsky District